The 80th Reserve Division (80. Reserve-Division) was a unit of the Imperial German Army in World War I.  The division was formed at the end of December 1914 and organized over the next month, arriving in the line in early February 1915. It was part of the second large wave of new divisions formed at the outset of World War I, which were numbered the 75th through 82nd Reserve Divisions.  The division was initially part of XXXX Reserve Corps.  The division was disbanded in 1919 during the demobilization of the German Army after World War I.  The division was mixed in recruitment.  The 264th Reserve Infantry Regiment was from Thuringia, and was described as a Saxe-Altenburg regiment.  The  265th Reserve Infantry Regiment was from the Grand Duchy of Mecklenburg-Schwerin.  The 266th was also formed in the Grand Duchy of Mecklenburg-Schwerin, but reportedly included recruits from Mecklenburg-Strelitz, Pomerania and other areas.  The 34th Reserve Infantry Regiment, which replaced the 265th in 1915, was from West Prussia.

Combat chronicle

The 80th Reserve Division initially fought on the Eastern Front, seeing its first action in the Second Battle of the Masurian Lakes.  In 1915, it fought in the siege of Kovno and the battles on the Neman River and at Vilnius.  From October 1915 to December 1916, the division was engaged in positional warfare, and fought in battles along Lake Narač, after which it was transferred to the Western Front.  It was in reserve and then engaged in positional warfare in Flanders and the Artois until April 1917, when it fought in the Battle of Arras.  Later in 1917, it fought in the Battle of Passchendaele and resisted the French offensive at Verdun.  The division participated in the German 1918 Spring Offensive, fighting in the First Battle of the Somme (1918), also called the Second Battle of the Somme (to distinguish it from the 1916 battle).  It later resisted various Allied counteroffensives, including the Oise-Aisne Offensive and the Meuse-Argonne Offensive.  Allied intelligence rated the division as third class.

Order of battle on formation

The 80th Reserve Division, like the other divisions of its wave and unlike earlier German divisions, was organized from the outset as a triangular division.  The order of battle of the division on December 29, 1914, was as follows:

80.Reserve-Infanterie-Brigade
Reserve-Infanterie-Regiment Nr. 264
Reserve-Infanterie-Regiment Nr. 265
Reserve-Infanterie-Regiment Nr. 266
Reserve-Radfahrer-Kompanie Nr. 80
Reserve-Kavallerie-Abteilung Nr. 80
80.Reserve-Feldartillerie-Brigade
Reserve-Feldartillerie-Regiment Nr. 65
Reserve-Feldartillerie-Regiment Nr. 66
Reserve-Pionier-Kompanie Nr. 82
Reserve-Pionier-Kompanie Nr. 83

Order of battle on March 29, 1918

The most significant wartime structural change in the divisions of this wave was the reduction from two field artillery regiments to one.  Over the course of the war, other changes took place, including the formation of artillery and signals commands and the enlargement of combat engineer support to a full pioneer battalion.  The order of battle on March 29, 1918, was as follows:

80.Reserve-Infanterie-Brigade
Reserve-Infanterie-Regiment Nr. 34
Reserve-Infanterie-Regiment Nr. 264
Reserve-Infanterie-Regiment Nr. 266
4.Eskadron/Husaren-Regiment Kaiser Franz Josef von Österreich, König von Ungarn (Schleswig-Holsteinisches) Nr. 16
Artillerie-Kommandeur 80
Reserve-Feldartillerie-Regiment Nr. 66
III.Bataillon/Fußartillerie-Regiment Nr. 27 (from August 10, 1918)
 Pionier-Bataillon Nr. 380
Reserve-Pionier-Kompanie Nr. 82
Reserve-Pionier-Kompanie Nr. 83
Minenwerfer-Kompanie Nr. 280
Divisions-Nachrichten-Kommandeur 480

References
 80. Reserve-Division (Chronik 1914/1918) - Der erste Weltkrieg
 Hermann Cron et al., Ruhmeshalle unserer alten Armee (Berlin, 1935)
 Hermann Cron, Geschichte des deutschen Heeres im Weltkriege 1914-1918 (Berlin, 1937)
 Günter Wegner, Stellenbesetzung der deutschen Heere 1815-1939. (Biblio Verlag, Osnabrück, 1993), Bd. 1
 Histories of Two Hundred and Fifty-One Divisions of the German Army which Participated in the War (1914-1918), compiled from records of Intelligence section of the General Staff, American Expeditionary Forces, at General Headquarters, Chaumont, France 1919 (1920)

Notes

Infantry divisions of Germany in World War I
Military units and formations established in 1914
Military units and formations disestablished in 1919
1914 establishments in Germany